Ignacio Suarez is a fictional character in the American dramedy series Ugly Betty, portrayed by Tony Plana.

Background
Ignacio Suarez is the father of both Betty and her sister Hilda, and grandfather to Hilda's son Justin. Ignacio used to be an amateur boxer in Mexico and is known to be an excellent cook. Ignacio supports Betty in her job at MODE, even though both he and Hilda worry she won't survive the world of fashion. Betty, on the other hand, is more concerned about his well-being, because he has a heart condition and continually drinks caffeinated beverages. Also, while Betty attempts to get Ignacio an HMO provider, it appears he tries to avoid them because of his illegal immigration status. He hides the truth about who he is, and uses the social security number and name of a person who, had he been alive, would be 117 years old.

Ignacio admits he came to the United States with Rosa (in December 1976) after he fell in love with her while she was married to a wealthy banker and Ignacio was working as their chef. The banker was physically abusive toward her and she started an affair with Ignacio. The banker discovered the affair and attacked Ignacio, prompting Ignacio to kill him in self-defense.

Ignacio is later arrested by Immigrations and Customs, but wis let go and has been told he will need a case worker for his deportation hearing, who shows up in the form of Constance Grady, who falls for him and hold up his paperwork for citizenship. Constance is later found out by Hilda she was fired and someone else took over Ignacio's case. But as he is about to celebrate his chance to obtain his citizenship as his paperwork was about to be approved, he gets bad news from his real caseworker that he will have to return to Mexico.

Upon arrival in Mexico, Betty and Hilda learn more of their mother's past as Ignacio reveals to his daughters their maternal grandmother was alive and she did not approve of his affair and marriage to their mother, but after Betty finally visits her, the woman (who has alzheimer's) mistakes her granddaughter for her daughter and says she has forgiven them and Ignacio watches this exchange as the woman makes peace with him. Unfortunately, Ignacio learns the US consulate has denied him a visa, and was told he will have to stay in his home country. This doesn't set well with Ignacio, who wants to return to America and is willing to enter it illegally, prompting Betty to agree to a deal by Wilhelmina to keep quiet about telling Daniel after she steals a magazine mock-up and witnesses Wilhelmina sleeping with her bodyguard so she can obtain a visa.

The return to Mexico also means bad news for Ignacio as well: It appears after 30 years, Ignacio is the target of a revenge plot against him ever since he murdered the banker. Eventually, just as he is about to return to the States (after Betty's deal with Wilhelmina), a person shows up with a gun, ready to kill Ignacio. It turns out the person holding the gun was Hector Vasquez, who happens to be the banker's son. He also stuns Ignacio by telling someone wants to see him: his father Ramiro Vasquez... who shows up alive and not dead, as Ignacio discovered. Ramiro wants Hector to kill Ignacio, but Ignacio reminded Hector of why Rosa left Ramiro for him by remembering the abuse Rosa suffered at the hands of Ramiro. The end result left no conclusions as to who is shot, but Ignacio did manage to return to the United States, where he was finally reunited with the rest of the family. As it did not appear he received any injuries, it was probably not Ignacio shot.

Upon his return, Ignacio becomes a legal resident of the United States. He also learns of the deal Betty made with Wilhelmina, getting her fired by Daniel (after Hilda told Ignacio). After learning of Daniel's father Bradford in the hospital and discovering Betty bringing her belongings home, Ignacio, and with the help of Claire, shows up at the hospital and tells Daniel about why Betty did it and gets him and Alexis to reunite with their mother before she is arrested.

Ignacio has a heart attack in the episode Dressed for Success, but by the next episode however it appears he is just fine. After that turn of events, he falls for his nurse, Elena, and the two start a relationship. Upon learning that she was offered a job in California, Ignacio proposes to Elena and she accepts, but once he understands how much the opportunity means to her, he allows her to go and they decide to start a long-distance relationship. While Elena is in California, Ignacio briefly finds a new flame, a Jewish pharmacist named Jean. They break-up off-screen and Elena soon returns to New York City for Hilda's wedding, reuniting with Ignacio.

Connections
Walter - Betty's former on-again/off-again boyfriend; Was more friendly to him and thought he should be with Betty, but changed his mind when he realized Betty can make up her mind about being in love. Also helps him with romantic advice.
Santos - Hilda's on-again/off-again boyfriend and Justin's father; He would rather see him stay away from the family because of his gambling problems, ruining Hilda's life even though she loves him and being an absent father to Justin. In "Petra-Gate" he asked Hilda to marry him and she said yes, but Ignacio still doesn't trust him and believes he hasn't changed.
Constance Grady - Ignacio's former caseworker; In the episode "Sofia's Choice", Ignacio met the feisty Grady, who has given him a hard time to the point he wanted her replaced (to no avail, thanks to her). But when he gives her a gift after coming up with proof of entering the States, she hugs him, resulting in a surprised reaction from Ignacio. She would later fall for him despite Ignacio's non-attraction to her, but after he tells her she wasn't his girlfriend she turned on him by slapping an electronic ankle bracelet on him as payback. Hilda would later learn in "Punch Out" Constance was fired for being too involved with her clients; Ignacio decided against pressing charges, realizing she had her heart broken too many times.
Henry Grubstick - Betty's current crush/boyfriend; He is not happy about Betty seeing her co-worker after learning of his ex Charlie carrying his baby, but is willing to respect Betty's decision to continue dating him until he leaves for Tucson.

References

External links

Ugly Betty characters
Fictional immigrants to the United States
Television characters introduced in 2006
Fictional chefs
Fictional Mexican-American people

fr:Liste des personnages d'Ugly Betty